Below is a timeline of major events, media, and people at the intersection of LGBT topics and BYU. Before 1959 there was little explicit mention of homosexuality by BYU administration.

1940s
 1948 – Gay BYU students Kent Goodridge Taylor and Richard Snow who were in love went to visit with church president George Albert Smith who told them to "live their lives as best they could" in their companionship. Smith wrote the words "Homo Sexual" in his appointment book. Earl Kofoed who went to BYU from 1946 to 1948 similarly reported a "live and let live" attitude of leaders towards LGBT Mormons, and described a thriving gay community of friends at BYU. He stated that there were no witch hunts, excommunications, or pressure to change ones sexual orientation at BYU like there would be in later decades.

1950s
 1959 – BYU began their on-campus electroshock and vomit aversion therapy program for males experiencing same-sex sexual attractions.

1960s

 1962 – The apostles Spencer W. Kimball and Mark E. Peterson told BYU president Ernest L. Wilkinson that no student suspected of experiencing homosexual feelings should be allowed to attend BYU.
 1962 – BYU president Ernest L. Wilkinson stated in a speech to the student body that people with homosexual feelings would not be allowed to enroll or remain as students since they contaminate the campus.
 1963 – Elouise Bell began teaching in the BYU English Department. Bell lived with and was in a long-term relationship with Provo High School teacher Margo E. LeVitre for many of her years at BYU, which she apparently kept secret from the university administration. In 2015, after her retirement, Bell married Nancy R Jefferis.  
 1964 – Apostle Kimball addressed seminary and institute faculty in a July 10 speech on BYU campus titled "A Counselling Problem in the Church", in which he called homosexuality a "malady", "disease", and an "abominable and detestable crime against nature" that was "curable" by "self mastery." He cited one lay bishop (a businessman by trade) assigned by the church to administer a "program of rehabilitation" through which there had been "numerous cures." He said "the police, the courts, and the judges" had referred "many cases directly" to the church.
 1965 – Kimball again addressed homosexuality in his January 5 BYU speech "Love vs. Lust." He called it a "gross", "heinous", "obnoxious", "abominable" "vicious" sin. The text states that those with homosexual "desires and tendencies" could "correct" and "overcome" it "the same as if he had the urge toward petting or fornication or adultery", but that "the cure ... is like the cure for alcoholism, subject to continued vigilance." In the speech he stated BYU "will never knowingly enroll ... nor tolerate ... anyone with these tendencies who fails to repent", and that it is a "damnable heresy" for a homosexual person to say "God made them that way." He also states that sometimes masturbation is an introduction to homosexuality.
 1965 – Five suicides of gay male BYU students are reported in one year.
 1967 – After a policy change allowing BYU bishops to share confidential information gained from the students during interviews with BYU administration took place, a dramatic rise in students suspected of homosexual activity was reported totaling 72 recorded by BYU administration by the end of August 1968. Security files were kept by BYU on students suspected of being gay and students were encouraged to spy on other students.
 1969 – BYU alumnus and Mormon painter Trevor Southey joined BYU's faculty teaching art until he was fired in 1979. He had attended the university as a student from 1965 to 1969 and later divorced his wife and came out as gay in 1982. He died in 2015 at the age of 75.

1970s
 1971 – Jim Dabakis enrolled at BYU after serving an LDS mission, but left and came out at as gay at the age of 23. He was elected to the Utah State Senate in 2012.
 1971 – Kenneth Mark Storer was a gay Mormon BYU graduate student. He would later become a pastor in the gay-friendly Metropolitan Community Church in Salt Lake, Boise, and Tacoma, and a leader in an AIDS-victim advocacy group in the 80s.
 1973 – It was decided by the BYU Board of Trustees that the ban on people attracted to those of the same sex would be lifted and they could enroll at BYU with local church leadership permission as long as they were not sexually expressing their attractions.
 1973 – BYU psychology professor Allen Bergin published an article in the July New Era portraying some homosexuals as "psychologically disturbed persons" who are "compulsively driven to frequent and sometimes bizarre acts." He cited two clients with "compulsive or uncontrollable homosexuality" caused by intense fear for the opposite sex, a lack of social skills for male-female relationships, and seeking security exclusively from the same sex. Bergin discussed the behaviorist sexual orientation change efforts he used in an attempt to change their same-sex sexual behavior and attractions.

 1974 – BYU president Oaks delivered a speech on campus in which he spoke in favor of keeping criminal punishment for "deviate sexual behavior" such as private, consensual, same-sex sexual activity. The speech was later printed by the university's press.
 1974 – Church president Kimball addressed the BYU student body stating that sex reassignment surgeries were an appalling travesty.
 1975 – As part of the ongoing BYU security homosexual entrapment campaigns, BYU security claimed that an agency director for the US Department of Social Services man was caught soliciting sex by tapping his feet in a bathroom stall next to an undercover officer while visiting the campus, but the man denied the charges and called the security sting harassment. BYU banned the man from campus after he refused to meet with campus officials.
 1976 – The church-operated university BYU began a purge in January to expel homosexual students as part of president Oaks' widespread campaign to curtail the influence of homosexual people on campus. The purge including interrogations of fine arts and drama students and surveillance of Salt Lake City gay bars by BYU security. These activities were noted in the Salt Lake Tribune and the gay newspaper Advocate.
 1976 – BYU music professor Carlyle Marsden took his own life two days after being outed by an arrest for alleged homosexual activity.
 1976 – A 20-year study by a BYU Sociology professor is published showing that 10% of BYU men and 2% of BYU women indicated having had a "homosexual experience." In 1950, 1961, and 1972 Wilford E. Smith conducted a survey of thousands of Mormon students at several universities including many from the BYU sociology department as part of a larger survey. He found that "the response of Mormons [at BYU] did not differ significantly from the response of Mormons in state universities."
 1977 – After hearing anti-gay rhetoric from BYU professor Reed Payne, BYU student Cloy Jenkins and gay BYU instructor Lee Williams produced the Payne Papers (later called Prologue) outlining information and experiences in defense of homosexual Mormons. It was later anonymously mailed to all high-ranking church leaders.
 1977 Stephan Zakharias (formerly Stephen James Matthew Prince) and a group of other lesbian and gay Mormons and former-Mormons organized the first official LGBTQ Mormon group under the name Affirmation: Gay Mormons United on June 11 in Salt Lake City at the conference for the Salt Lake Coalition for Human Rights.

 1978 – The apostle Boyd K. Packer delivered a sermon at BYU on March 5 entitled "To the One", which went on to be published by the church as a pamphlet. Packer characterizes homosexual interaction as a perversion and presents the possibility that it had its roots in selfishness and could be cured with "unselfish thoughts, with unselfish acts." He states that the church had not previously talked more about homosexuality because "some matters are best handled very privately" and "we can very foolishly cause things we are trying to prevent by talking too much about them."

 1978 – In November BYU Security began placing entrapment ads in a monthly Salt Lake City LGBT newspaper to ensnare BYU students. This resulted in the 1979 arrest of David Chipman, a former BYU student, who made a romantic advance after being taken on a drive by undercover BYU security agent David Neumann posing as a gay BYU student. Chipman's controversial conviction due to the security officers making an arrest outside their jurisdiction for an entrapment case went to the Utah State Supreme Court.
 1979 – Under the guidance of BYU president Dallin H. Oaks, BYU security began campaigns to entrap any students participating in same-sex sexual behavior and purge them from the university.
 1979 – BYU's newspaper published a series of articles in April quoting BYU and church leaders and gay students on homosexuality. The series included comments by Maxine Murdock of the BYU Counseling Center and Ford McBride, a former psychology student who conducted BYU electroshock aversion experiments on fourteen gay BYU students.  McBride and Murdock estimated that 4% of BYU students (or around 1,200 students) are homosexual. Additionally, commissioner of LDS Social Services Harold Brown stated that homosexuality is not biological or inborn, and that church leaders just want to help them overcome their problem, and Victor Brown Jr. compared it to an alcoholic's addiction that can be cured.

 1979 – A BYU alumni sign among others was held aloft by the Affirmation group at the Los Angeles Pride Parade in what was called the first out gay Mormon presence at a pride parade. One of the participants was interviewed on camera wearing a BYU jersey.

1980s
 1982 – The Church-owned television station KBYU refused to air the third segment of a documentary on homosexuality in Utah in part because it contained interviews of anonymous gay BYU students. The producer Kevin Mitchell stated their faces were not shown as he believed they would be kicked out of BYU if their identities were revealed.
 1982 – In an address to BYU on August 28, then president of Ricks College Bruce C. Hafen counseled students to avoid homosexuality "at all costs, no matter what the circumstances." He further cited the 1973 removal of homosexuality as a mental disorder from the DSM as an example of something gone wrong "deep within our national soul."	
 1986 – BYU published a study by BYU professor and area Church Welfare Services director Victor Brown Jr. stating that people can eliminate homosexual feelings.
 1986 – Church Seventy Theodore M. Burton implied a link between a "selfish indulgence" in pornography and homosexuality in his address to BYU on June 3.
 1986 – An article was published referencing a gay BYU student who had been preparing for an opposite-sex temple marriage in the 80s under counsel from BYU professor and stake president Richard H. Cracroft. A few months into the marriage the man shot himself, and Cracroft stated that "Admittedly, not many of us know how to counsel homosexuals."
 1988 – BYU psychologist Allen E. Bergin was published in the October Ensign stating that homosexuality was "caused by some combination of biology and environment."
 1988 – Gay BYU history professor and former BYU student D. Michael Quinn resigned under increasing pressure for publications on controversial aspects of Mormon history after working for the university since 1976. He came out as gay in 1996 when his book Same-Sex Dynamics Among Nineteenth-Century Americans: A Mormon Example was released.

1990s
 1990s – Transgender woman Cammie Vanderveur a BYU engineering student gender expressed wearing a dress on campus only at night to avoid punishment.
 1990 – The independent BYU newspaper Student Review began publishing articles on the topic of homosexuality, dedicating an entire issue to the discussion, and frequently addressing the topic over the next four years.
 1991 – An informal poll of students by an independent BYU newspaper found that 5% of current students identified their sexual orientation as gay and 22% of all students knew of a BYU student who was gay or lesbian.
 1992 – The apostle Packer stated in a sermon at BYU sermon that humans can degrade themselves below animals by pairing with people of the same-sex since animals don't mate with other animals of the same sex. However, same-sex pairing has been observed in more than 1,500 species, and well-documented for 500 of them.
 1994 – Then apostle James E. Faust gave a November speech on campus in which he stated that homosexuality is not biological or inborn and that same-sex marriage would unravel families, the fabric of human society.
 1994 – BYU published an anthropology masters thesis titled Cross-Cultural Categories of Female Homosexuality.
 mid-1990s – BYU's on-campus electroshock aversion therapy program which had begun in 1959 ended over three decades later in the mid-1990s.
 1996 – BYU Spanish professor Thomas Matthews was reported to a top LDS authority in July for previously stating that he was gay in private conversations. He stated that BYU did not like that he was out of the closet despite being celibate and keeping BYU codes of conduct, and eventually left the university. BYU president Lee had stated that it was "simply not comfortable for the university" for him to continue teaching there.
 1996 – A campus group for gay students and friends "Open Forum" was founded, and with faculty advisor Paul Thomas they sought but were denied official club status from BYU administrators.
 1997 – A poll of over 400 BYU students found that 42% of students believed that even if a same-sex attracted person keeps the honor code they should not be allowed to attend BYU and nearly 80% said they would not live with a roommate attracted to people of the same sex. The poll's stated 5 percent margin of error was criticized as being too low an estimate because of the cluster sampling in classes, however.
 1997 – The university newspaper published an article featuring several openly gay students. One lesbian student told her roommates and one moved out because of it. A housing manager said that some students panic when they find out their roommate is attracted to some people of the same sex and he advised them to go to the Honor Code Office. The Honor Code Office director Rush Sumpter stated that BYU forbids actions of verifiable, overt displays of gay affection, but does not punish attractions. One student stated she tried to pray her feelings away, and another said her parents sent her to BYU in an attempt to straighten out her homosexual feelings.
 1998 – Out gay student Sam Clayton graduated from BYU after activism in helping organize the LGBT student group "Open Forum" and conducting sociological surveys on LGBT topics at BYU. He reported threats of expulsion from BYU administrators.

2000s
 2000 – BYU's newspaper published an article in which some students questioned BYU's official neutrality on same-sex marriage initiatives in California. 
 2000 – On February 25 Stuart Matis, a former BYU student and a gay Mormon active in the church, died by suicide on the steps of a California church stake center building. Four days before his death he wrote a letter that was published in the BYU newspaper pleading for the acceptance of homosexual individuals in response to a letter published by BYU five days before which compared homosexuality to pedophilia, bestiality and Satanism. Right before his death he wrote a note stating, "God never intended me to be straight. Hopefully, my death might be a catalyst for some good."
 2000 – BYU psychology professor Richard Williams presented a criticism of same-sex parenting at BYU's 2000 World Family Policy Forum.
 2001 – At BYU's Family Under Fire Conference, LDS Family Services director Jerry Harris gave some "steps to recovery" from homosexuality for gay people to use.
 2003 – After facing criticism from several organizations KBYU and BYU-TV cancelled the planned broadcast of LDS therapists Jeff Robinson's presentation "Homosexuality: What Works and What Doesn't Work" given at BYU's 2002 Families Under Fire conference. The talk characterized homosexuality as a serious addiction that could be cured with enough motivation, and stated that gay men can develop a sexual attraction to women if they walk away from rather than focusing on or fighting the dragon of their gayness.
 2003 – Former BYU student Clay Essig reported writing a note while at the brink of suicide after years of trying to change his attractions through therapy originally prescribed to him by his BYU bishop.
 2003 – For his senior project a BYU student created a documentary Troy Through a Window about his gay brother and how his Mormon family dealt with his coming out.
 2003 – LDS Family Services counselor Jerry Harris presented at BYU's Families Under Fire conference on helping people overcome their homosexuality.
 2004 – In March BYU molecular biology professor William Bradshaw received media attention for presenting evidence for biological underpinnings to human homosexuality.
 2005 – The Foundation for Attraction Research (FAR) was founded and run by mostly BYU professors including BYU psychology professor Dean Byrd, BYU social work professor Shirley Cox, with a board of directors also consisting of BYU English professor Doris Dant, BYU law professor William Duncan, BYU religion professor John Livingstone, and retired BYU psychology professor Gawain Wells. In 2009 the organization published Understanding Same-Sex Attraction which advocated therapy to change sexual attractions. In 2012 FAR co-hosted the Reconciling Faith and Feelings conference with the Association of Mormon Counselors and Psychotherapists (AMCAP).
 2005 – At BYU's Families Under Fire Conference social work professor Shirley Cox presented on homosexuality stating that homosexual attractions can be diminished and that the treatment of unwanted same-sex attraction has a history of being successful.
 2006 – Soulforce's Equality Ride made a stop at BYU campus in April protesting BYU's policies towards LGBTQ students. 5 riders were arrested on the 10th for giving speeches on campus, while other riders were allowed to remain answering student questions as long as they did not make a demonstration. The next day 5 current and 4 former BYU students and 15 riders were arrested for involvement in a procession of about 30 individuals bringing lilies onto campus and lying down in a 'die-in' in remembrance of LGBT Mormon suicide victims. Those arrested later received a $200 fine.
 2006 – In June BYU fired adjunct professor Jeffrey Nielsen for writing an opinion piece in support of same-sex marriage.
 2007 – Soulforce's Equality Ride made a second stop at BYU's campus on March 22. The demonstration resulted in two arrests when a mother and her transgender son walked onto campus to present administrators with a collection of concerns from former and current BYU LGBTQ students.
 2007 – BYU Law professor Lynn Wardle addressed the 4th World Congress of Families in Poland on same-sex marriage and published his speech in a law journal. He compared his warnings "tragic consequences" and "dangers of legalizing same-sex marriage" as the warnings of a Hungarian man warning Elie Wiesel's town about the dangers the incoming Nazis posed to the Jewish population there. He also stated that if same-sex marriages were legalized there would be no basis to deny polygamous or incestuous marriages, and a decreased ability to "protect their children from exposure to gay propaganda."
 2007 – Shortly after the Soul Force demonstration, the BYU Board of Trustees, under the direction of First Presidency member Thomas S. Monson, revised the BYU Honor Code in April to clarify that "one's stated same-gender attraction is not an Honor Code issue" while continuing to ban "all forms of physical intimacy that give expression to homosexual feelings."
 2007 – Actor Taylor Frey stated that he'd experienced what he called a witch hunt in which he was falsely reported to the Honor Code Office by another student for same-sex romantic behavior with what was a platonic friend.
 2009 – The first explicit mention of homosexuality in the language of the school's code of conduct available to students was publicly published in the Fall.

2010s

2010
 2010 – Shortly after a policy change removing the ban on LGBT BYU students gathering together in a group, LGBT and straight students began weekly meetings on BYU campus as USGA to discuss issues relating to homosexuality and the LDS Church.

2011
 January – A BYU law student stated that he was threatened with expulsion for publishing the book Homosexuality: A Straight BYU Student's Perspective which contained arguments in favor of same-sex marriage.
 February – BYU's Honor Code was updated to remove the ban on any "advocacy of homosexual behavior" defined as "promoting homosexual relations as being morally acceptable."
 November – BYU fired a gay broadcasting department faculty member. The employee stated that BYU had become an increasingly hostile work environment and that being gay played into his being fired.

2012
 March – LGBT BYU students received national attention for their "It Gets Better" video.
 April – A Sociology Department panel of LGBT BYU students received press coverage as well as complaints to the university from a conservative political group.
 December – By the end of the year USGA was banned from meeting on campus and continues to be banned . USGA moved its meetings to the Provo City Library.

2013
 February – Gay BYU student Jimmy Hales gained media attention with a comedic video of coming out live to family and friends.
 May – Ty Mansfield, a sexual minority Latter-day Saint who has been open about his sexuality, started teaching as an adjunct instructor in Religious Education at BYU, where he has continued to teach since.

2014
 January – In a BYU devotional, BYU professor Jonathan Sandberg mentions the church's website mormonsandgays.org and encourages people who are experiencing challenges like the "struggle" of "same-gender attraction" to keep faith and trust God.
 April – A BYU survey to students gained media attention for only giving the option of "heterosexual but struggles with same-sex attraction" or "heterosexual and does not struggle with same-sex attraction" for identifying ones sexual orientation.
 August – The BYU Bookstore briefly sold greeting cards for congratulating recently married same-sex couples. The cards were quickly pulled making international news.
 October – BYU student Curtis Penfold left the church because he disagreed with its teachings on LGBT rights and was kicked out of his apartment, fired from his job, and expulsed from BYU. He stated that he, "felt so hated by this community I used to love."
 October – A film student Scott Raia's documentary about queer BYU students Bridey Jensen and Samy Galvez was shown on campus.

2015
 January – A gay BYU student and Church Missionary Training Center employee was physically assaulted by his roommates after he told one of them that he was gay. The man experienced bruised ribs after allegedly being dragged from his room amid gay slurs. The situation resulted in a lawsuit.
 September – In a BYU Devotional address Ronald A. Rasband, then in the Presidency of the Seventy, addressed concerns about the church's involvement in politics. He shared hypothetical stories of a man fired for being gay and a woman marginalized at work for being Mormon and bemoaned that it is less politically correct to empathize with the religious woman. He invited students to discuss LGBT rights and religious freedom and to write comments on his Facebook post. The address was later reprinted in a church magazine.
 2015 –  In a survey of 92 LGBTQ BYU students done by USGA, 52% had at some point considered self-harm.

2016
 January – The advocacy organization FreeBYU filed an accreditation complaint to the American Bar Association against the BYU law school. The complaint argued that the honor code's prohibition of dating, romantic expression, and marriage between same-sex partners, but not their heterosexual counterparts, violated the accrediting body's anti-discrimination policies. The American Bar Association acknowledged the complaint and forwarded it to committee for consideration, then rejected the complaint after BYU made changes to its Honor Code.
 February – BYU student Harry Fisher came out on Facebook in 2015. About two months later after experiences of hearing anti-gay rhetoric from individuals around him, and after instances of having to leave his BYU singles ward meeting to cry in his car, he died by suicide on February 12, 2016.
 August – BYU and Church policies on LGBT persons got the spotlight as these served as a deterrent in their football team being considered as a Fall addition to the Big 12 Conference.

 August – During the BYU Title IX controversy around the university's policies and treatment of student survivors of sexual assault, the Salt Lake Tribune published an article containing firsthand accounts of several current and former LGBTQ BYU students who were sexually assaulted or raped as students and their subsequent experiences with administrators.
 October – BYU student Jessyca Fulmer was featured on the LDS church's website Mormon and Gay.
 November – The Provo newspaper Daily Herald published a series of six in-depth articles on the experiences of BYU LGBT students, centered around the topics of why they attend, USGA, mental health, the Honor Code, and why some leave. The articles were written over the space of two months, with an editorial conclusion at the end of the series asking administrators to listen to LGBT BYU students.

2017
 April – The first LGBT-specific campus-wide event was held on the 7th by the BYU NAMI club. Some LGBTQ BYU students discussed some of their experiences and difficulties posed by being a sexual or gender minority at BYU. For comparison, a similar-sized university just up the road in Salt Lake City had its first official LGBT campus event and student group over 45 years before in 1971.
 September – BYU students and a professor are featured prominently in an article on the Provo LGBT Pride Festival.
 September – The unofficial BYU group "Rise and Shout" held the university's first LGBTQ alumni gathering.
 October – A lesbian BYU student gained media attention for her coming out images and quotes on Faces of USGA.
 October – A Provo newspaper published an article on transgender current and former BYU students.
 November – In response to a question about LGBT young single adults in the church the apostle Ballard told BYU students in a campus-wide event that, "I believe you have a place in the kingdom and recognize that sometimes it may be difficult for you to see where you fit in the Lord's Church, but you do." He also told cisgender, heterosexual members, "We need to listen to and understand what our LGBT brothers and sisters are feeling and experiencing. Certainly, we must do better than we have done in the past so that all members feel they have a spiritual home." He further explained that church leaders believe "core rights of citizenship should be protected for all people — for LGBT people, for people of all faiths", and that "reasonable compromises" should be found "in other areas when rights conflict." He stated that church leaders supported the recent LoveLoud Festival to send a message that "LGBT youth or anyone else should never be mistreated."
 November – A BYU survey was released having been completed by 43% of students in which .2% of the 12,602 who completed the survey (or 25 responders) reported that their gender identity was transgender or something other than cisgender male or female.

2018
 March – BYU Student Life hosted the first university-hosted LGBT campus event. It featured a panel of four students answering student-submitted questions.
 April – After a controversy over BYU's policies around LGBT people, a conference for the US Society for Political Methodology was moved off of campus citing a "long-strained relations between the LGBTQ community and BYU" and concerns over the university's ban on homosexual behavior which the Society repudiated along with "the intolerance it represents."
 July – Church leaders' continued denial of BYU LGBT students' years of requests to form a club on campus received national coverage.
November – The NCAA Common Ground IV forum was hosted at BYU.  The goal of this forum is to "establish inclusive and respectful athletics environments for participants of all sexual orientations, gender identities and religious beliefs. Notable attendees were the president of BYU, Kevin J Worthen, and NCAA Vice president of Inclusion and Human Resources, Katrice Albert.
November – BYU's Instagram was hosted by an out gay student for a day and he answered questions about being a gay BYU student.

2019
April – At a graduation ceremony speech the Political Science Department's valedictorian came out as gay publicly for the first time, an event which received national media attention.
July – Emma Gee became the first Division I athlete in BYU's 143-year history to be publicly out, after she came out as bisexual. She reported having what she called a traumatizing and homophobic required meeting with her bishop in which her sexual orientation was discussed.
August – KUER's Lee Hale talked to former BYU faculty member Kerry Spencer about the "Growing Queer Community" at BYU.
September – The American Geophysical Union in Washington, D.C., and the Geological Society of America in Colorado pulled BYU professor job ads from their websites after complaints from constituents that BYU's honor code discriminates against anyone in a same-sex marriage or relationship from applying in violation of both organizations' ethical standards.
November – BYU's first LGBTQ-specific on-campus center, the BYU Office of Student Success and Inclusion is formed.

2020s

2020
January – The BYU Office of Student Success and Inclusion hosted a panel focused on LGBTQ+ topics at BYU.
February – BYU removed the ban on "homosexual behavior" from its Honor Code, which many initially thought finally allowed LGBT students to perform ordinary public displays of romantic affection, although, like straight students, they still must abstain from sexual relationships outside of marriage. However, BYU's leadership later clarified removing "homosexual behavior" from its Honor Code still did not permit any public displays of romantic affection towards a same-sex partner or same-sex dating which sparked more outrage and protests from the LGBT community and allies. Jim Brau, a professor in BYU's finance program, was targeted online with death threats from the alt-right LDS group DezNat after calling the changes to the Honor Code a "blessing".
March – A poll of 7,625 BYU students found that over 13% (996) of those surveyed indicated that their sexual orientation was something other than "strictly heterosexual."
July – Same-Sex Attracted a documentary by queer BYU students about queer BYU students debuted at the Salt Lake City LGBTQ film festival.

2021
March – Color the Campus, an LGBT awareness group at BYU, held a Rainbow Day on March 4 to commemorate one year since the same-sex dating policy clarification. Rainbow Day is held about once per semester to "[show love] and support for LGBTQ+ students and faculty at all CES schools", as stated on the group's Instagram page. As part of the March 4 Rainbow Day, that night students lit the Y in rainbow colors for about an hour. About 20 minutes after the lighting began, BYU tweeted that it had not authorized the lighting of the Y that evening.
May - A BYU religion professor with a large social media following publicly called a gay BYU student a Book of Mormon term for an anti-Christ, drawing media criticism. The gay student also received death threats from others, but there was no public action against the professor by BYU.
June - BYU Pride, a student-run LGBT resource center, organized the first pride march at BYU. More than 1,000 marched from Joaquin Park to Kiwanis Park in support for queer BYU students. BYU Pride released a statement of purpose of the march calling for the university to publicly express love for the LGBT community at BYU and make specified changes to "alleviate hardships and improve the well-being of many BYU students"
August - BYU announced the opening of the Office of Belonging with BYU president Kevin Worthen stating that the office will help combat "prejudice of any kind, including that based on ... sexual orientation."
August - Church apostle Jeffrey Holland made a speech at BYU discussing LGBTQ people that drew lots of criticism in which he called for more "musket fire" from BYU faculty in opposition to same-sex marriage.
August - Days after Holland's speech on LGBTQ people, BYU students drew pro-LGBTQ chalk art on the corner of campus, but a BYU student vandalized the art on camera stating that "faggots go to hell". He was later either expelled or dropped out of the university.
September - Students again lit the Y in anticipation of Rainbow Day and LGBT history month. Sources claim that BYU administration was informally supportive of the demonstration and put BYU police on notice to protect students from counter protestors.
October – The U.S. Department of Education began a civil rights investigation of BYU to determine if the university's discipline of LGBTQ students violated the scope of the university's Title IX exemptions.

2022
January - BYU released new demonstration policy which includes a ban on all demonstrations on Y mountain, ostensibly in response to LGBTQ+ public expression, including the rainbow Y lightings in October and March 2021.
February - The U.S. Department of Education dismisses the civil rights investigation of BYU regarding the university's discipline of LGBTQ students, determining that the university was acting within its rights under its approved Title IX exemptions and that the Department of Education's Office of Civil Rights lacked jurisdiction to investigate further.
February - BYU cancels care for transgender clients receiving voice therapy at its speech clinic. The American Speech–Language–Hearing Association later issued a statement saying "BYU's decision was in direct opposition to practice expected"
February - Sue Bergin, who worked part-time at BYU as an adjunct instructor, was notified that her contract would not be renewed, which she speculated is because of her LGBTQ advocacy.
March - In anticipation of students lighting the Y in rainbow colors again for rainbow day, BYU fenced it off with orange mesh fencing and signs saying, "demonstrations are prohibited on the Y and university-owned portions of Y mountain. Violators are subject to criminal citations for trespassing." A few days later, students celebrating rainbow day were asked to leave campus for violating the new demonstration policy.
March - The LDS Church announced new questions that the Church Educational System will ask ecclesiastical leaders of potential new hires. One question that garnered public interest was: "Does this member have a testimony of The Church of Jesus Christ of Latter-day Saints and of its doctrine, including its teachings on marriage, family, and gender?"
April - Images of a BYU student on stage at the graduation ceremony showing the rainbow colors inside her graduation gown as a form of protest gained national media attention.
August - At the last minute BYU leaders had pamphlets about local LGBTQ events and off-campus resources removed from packets that were to be given to all incoming students.
October - As part of the nationwide "Strike Out Queerphobia" protest, over 100 students blocked off 800 N in protest of anti-LGBTQ+ policies.

See also

 Homosexuality and The Church of Jesus Christ of Latter-day Saints
 Gender minorities and the Church of Jesus Christ of Latter-day Saints
 LGBT rights in Utah
 LGBT Mormon suicides
 Sexuality and Mormonism

References

LGBT and Mormonism
LGBT history in the United States
LGBT Timeline
History of colleges and universities in Utah
LGBT and education
LGBT in Utah
LGBT timelines